The Baruya are a tribe in the highlands of Papua New Guinea. They have been studied since 1967 by anthropologist Maurice Godelier. There are approximately 1500 Baruya people living in the Wonenara and Marawaka valleys.

References

External links
 Resources on the Baruya language

Ethnic groups in Papua New Guinea
Tribes of Oceania